Trinity Cathedral is an Episcopal cathedral located at 100 West Roosevelt Street in Phoenix, Arizona, in the historic Roosevelt district.

History 

Construction of the original Trinity Church located at 2nd Avenue and Washington Streets was announced in 1885. New property was purchased, and plans were completed by the firm of Shepley, Rutan and Coolidge of Boston to relocate the church on West Roosevelt Street. A quadrangle model was adopted to form the cathedral close. On one side was the Cathedral House, completed in 1915. On the second side was the cathedral nave with first services held Christmas Day of 1920. On the third side was Atwood Hall, completed in 1931.

In 1914, Trinity Parish was designated to serve as the pro-cathedral for the Missionary Jurisdiction of Arizona and following the designation of the missionary jurisdiction as a diocese in 1959, Trinity became the fourth true cathedral of the Episcopal Church under the full control of the bishop and chapter in 1988, joining Grace Cathedral of San Francisco, the Cathedral of St. John the Divine in New York City and the Cathedral of Sts. Peter and Paul in Washington, D.C. Most US cathedrals of the Episcopal Church in the United States (as was Trinity Cathedral from 1914 to 1988) are parishes designated as pro-cathedrals appointed to serve as the seat (cathedra) for the bishop.

The church served as the base of several Episcopal missions in the metro Phoenix area. These included St. Andrew's Episcopal Church, Glendale, AZ; All Saints' Episcopal Church, Phoenix, Az; St. Paul's Episcopal Church, Phoenix, AZ (today San Pablo Mission), and Christ Church of the Ascension, Paradise Valley, AZ.

Music and arts 

The cathedral organ, built by the Schantz Organ Company of Orville, Ohio, is a four manual 71-rank pipe organ. In addition to being an integral part of worship services, it is also used by organ students at Arizona State University. The cathedral piano is a hand-crafted Bösendorfer concert grand from Vienna, Austria.

Trinity Cathedral hosts concerts and exhibits in the Olney Gallery located on the lower floor of Cathedral House. The Olney Gallery is one of the participants of Phoenix's First Friday Art Walk.

See also

 List of the Episcopal cathedrals of the United States
 List of cathedrals in the United States

References

External links
 The Episcopal Diocese of Arizona
 Trinity Cathedral
 Roosevelt Row

Churches in Phoenix, Arizona
Episcopal cathedrals in the United States
Episcopal church buildings in Arizona
Churches completed in 1931
1885 establishments in Arizona Territory